Davie Armour (11 April 1953 – 2004) was a Scottish former professional football player who is best known for his time with Ayr United.

Armour joined Rangers in 1974 from Shamrock Boys Club and had a loan spell at Kilbirnie Ladeside previously. He made his Rangers debut in the last league game of the 1976–77 season, a 2–1 defeat away to Aberdeen. He left Rangers to join Ayr United in 1979 and spent five seasons with the side. After which Armour moved on to Cowdenbeath for a three-year spell.

Armour died in 2004 of pancreatic cancer.  He was married with three daughters.

External links

1953 births
2004 deaths
Rangers F.C. players
Ayr United F.C. players
Cowdenbeath F.C. players
Association football midfielders
Scottish footballers
Kilbirnie Ladeside F.C. players